Anaches yitingi is a species of beetle in the family Cerambycidae. It was described by Holzschuh and Lin in 2013.

References

Pteropliini
Beetles described in 2013